The bridled sparrow (Peucaea mystacalis) is a species of bird in the family Passerellidae. It is endemic to Mexico. Its natural habitat is subtropical or tropical high-altitude shrubland. The species are brown coloured.

References

bridled sparrow
Endemic birds of Mexico
bridled sparrow
Taxonomy articles created by Polbot
Birds of the Sierra Madre del Sur
Balsas dry forests
Tehuacán Valley matorral